Dominic Baumann (born 24 April 1995) is a German professional footballer who plays as a forward for 3. Liga club FSV Zwickau since 2021.

References

External links

1995 births
Living people
German footballers
Association football midfielders
Dynamo Dresden players
1. FC Nürnberg II players
1. FC Nürnberg players
Würzburger Kickers players
FSV Zwickau players
2. Bundesliga players
3. Liga players
Regionalliga players
Footballers from Saxony
People from Oschatz
FC Sachsen Leipzig players